The Essex Rugby Football Union is the governing body for the sport of rugby union in the county of Essex in England.  The union is the constituent body of the Rugby Football Union (RFU) for Essex, and administers and organises rugby union clubs and competitions in the county.  It also administers the Essex county rugby representative teams.

History

The Essex RFU was established in 1885.  The first recorded match played by an Essex representative team was actually held a year before the union was created, when they lost to a representative team from neighbouring Suffolk at Chelmsford in 1884.  In December 1890 Essex would join with Suffolk and Norfolk to form the Eastern Counties Rugby Union, with Cambridgeshire joining later in 1920 and would participate in the County Championship.  Essex would try and leave the Eastern Counties and gain constituent body status but were refused by the Rugby Football Union three times in 1972, 1975 and 1977.  Finally in 2003 the county were awarded full status and would compete in the County Championship as an Essex side.

Senior county team 

The Essex senior men's team currently play in Division 2 of the County Championship having won promotion from Division 3 at the end of 2018.  The 2018 competition also marked the county's first appearance at Twickenham Stadium when they reached the Shield final, losing 22-24 to Dorset & Wilts.

Affiliated clubs
There are currently 44 clubs affiliated with the Essex RFU, with teams at both senior and junior level.

Bancroft
Barking
Basildon
Benfleet Vikings
Billericay
Braintree
Brentwood
Burnham-On-Crouch
Clacton 
Campion
Canvey Island
Chelmsford
Chingford
Dagenham
East London
Epping Upper Clapton
Eton Manor
Harlow
Harwich & Dovercourt
Ilford Wanderers
Kings Cross Steelers
Loughton
Maldon
Mavericks
May & Baker
Millwall
Old Brentwoods
Old Cooperians
Ongar
Pegasus Palmerians
Ravens
Rochford Hundred
Romford & Gidea Park
Runwell Wyverns
South Woodham Ferrers
Southend
Stanford-le-Hope
Thames
Upminster
Wanstead
Westcliff
Witham
Woodford
Writtle Wanderers

County club competitions 

The Essex RFU currently helps run the following club competitions:

Leagues
London 3 Essex - league ranked at tier 8 of the English rugby union system for clubs from Essex and north-east London
Essex Canterbury Jack 1 - tier 9 league
Essex Merit Tables - 7 divisions outside the league system mostly involving reserve team rugby (2nd to 5th XV) with the occasional 1st XV side

Cups

1st team:
Essex Senior Cup
Essex Intermediate Cup
Essex Senior Shield

2nd team:
Essex 2nd XV Cup
John Adler Trophy

Discontinued competitions
Essex 2 - tier 10 league that ran between 2003 and 2014
Essex 3 - tier 11 league that ran between 2003 and 2009

Notes

See also
London & SE Division
English rugby union system

References

External links 
Official website

Rugby union governing bodies in England
1885 establishments in England
Rugby union in Essex